.one is a top-level domain. It was proposed in ICANN's New generic top-level domain (gTLD) Program, and became available to the general public on May 20, 2015. One Registry (a subsidiary of One.com A/S) and ARI Registry Services (a Neustar company) are the registries for the domain.

With the  ICANN's New gTLD Program, One.com applied for management of the .one TLD One.com won at private auction with Radix Registry the rights to the ".one" string. The auction was the "single sealed bid second price" model, in which the winner offers the highest bid and pays the second highest bid.

As of September 2022, .one was the 27th-most registered top-level-domain on the Internet, with 187,874 registrations. One.com was the second highest registrar for .one, out of its 107 accredited registrars.

References

Top-level domains
Computer-related introductions in 2015